Subedarganj railway station is an important railway station in Prayagraj district, Uttar Pradesh. Its code is SFG. It serves Prayagraj city. Railways has sanctioned a budget of 26 crore as part of its plan to develop the Subedarganj station, situated close to the North Central Railway headquarters in Prayagraj, as a full-fledged terminal, Minister of State, Manoj Sinha said. A new FOB will be completed by November. Prayagraj's neighbouring Subedarganj is being developed as terminal station with a provision of a new platform, new FOB, and extension of the existing platform.

Electrification
The Cheoki–Subedarganj section was electrified in 1965–66.

Trains 
Some of the trains that runs from Subedarganj are:

 Subedarganj–Dehradun terminal Express
 Sangam Express
 Subedarganj–Kanpur Central MEMU
 Subedarganj–Pt. Deen Dayal Upadhyaya Jn. MEMU

See also 

 Allahabad Junction railway station
 Allahabad City railway station
 Cheoki Junction railway station
 Prayag Junction railway station

References

External links 

 SFG/SubedarGanj

Allahabad railway division
Railway stations in Allahabad